Jamestown is a home rule-class city in Russell County, Kentucky, in the United States. It is the seat of its county. The population was 1,794 at the 2010 U.S. census.

Geography
Jamestown is located at  (36.984730, -85.066840).

History
The community was established in 1826 to be the seat of the newly formed Russell County. It was briefly known as Jacksonville in honor of General Andrew Jackson, who had just won a plurality of the popular vote during the 1824 presidential election but lost the runoff in the House of Representatives, largely because of the "corrupt bargain" struck by Henry Clay and John Quincy Adams. However, an anti-Jacksonian party loyal to Clay came into power the same year and the post office was established in November as Jamestown after local landowner James Wooldridge, who (together with his brother John) had donated 110 acres of land for the town. The act of the state legislature incorporating the city in December continued this name, which the city has used since.

Demographics

At the 2000 census there were 1,624 people in 662 households, including 421 families, in the city. The racial makeup of the city was 94.89% White, 3.51% African American, 0.43% Asian, 0.12% from other races, and 1.05% from two or more races. Hispanic or Latino of any race were 0.86%.

Of the 662 households 30.5% had children under the age of 18 living with them, 44.3% were married couples living together, 15.0% had a female householder with no husband present, and 36.3% were non-families. 34.1% of households were one person and 15.6% were one person aged 65 or older. The average household size was 2.25 and the average family size was 2.87.

The age distribution was 23.0% under the age of 18, 7.9% from 18 to 24, 24.4% from 25 to 44, 22.0% from 45 to 64, and 22.7% 65 or older. The median age was 41 years. For every 100 females, there were 83.7 males. For every 100 females age 18 and over, there were 79.7 males.

The median household income was $18,587 and the median family income  was $25,234. Males had a median income of $24,375 versus $20,380 for females. The per capita income for the city was $11,140. About 25.8% of families and 30.0% of the population were below the poverty line, including 44.5% of those under age 18 and 14.2% of those age 65 or over.

Education
Jamestown has a lending library, a branch of the Russell County Public Library.

Climate
The climate in this area is characterized by hot, humid summers and generally mild to cool winters.  According to the Köppen Climate Classification system, Jamestown has a humid subtropical climate, abbreviated "Cfa" on climate maps.

References

Cities in Kentucky
Cities in Russell County, Kentucky
County seats in Kentucky
Populated places established in 1826
1826 establishments in Kentucky